Valašská Polanka is a municipality and village in Vsetín District in the Zlín Region of the Czech Republic. It has about 1,500 inhabitants.

Etymology
The name is derivered from the region of Moravian Wallachia in which it lies, and the word polana which meant a field lined with forest.

History
The first written mention of Polanka is from 1361. The name of Valašská Polanka has been used since 1929.

Gallery

References

External links

Villages in Vsetín District
Moravian Wallachia